René Duda (born 6 December 1996) is a Slovak footballer who plays as midfielder.

Career

FO ŽP Šport Podbrezová
Duda made his professional debut for FO ŽP Šport Podbrezová against FK Senica on 27 February 2016.

References

External links
 Fortuna Liga Profile
 FO ŽP Šport Podbrezová official club profile
 
 Futbalnet Profile

1996 births
Living people
Slovak footballers
Association football midfielders
FK Železiarne Podbrezová players
Slovak Super Liga players